This is a list of members of the Northern Territory Legislative Council from 8 December 1962 to 30 October 1965.

 "Appointed (N)" indicates the councillor was a Non-official Member appointed by the Territory Administrator, but generally from a community or business background, not a government official or public servant.
 Richard Ward resigned as member for Port Darwin on 14 June 1963. John Lyons was elected to replace him in a by-election on 13 July 1963.

See also
1962 Northern Territory general election

References

Members of Northern Territory parliaments by term
Members of the Northern Territory Legislative Council